The 2013–14 season is Sun Pegasus's 6th consecutive season in the Hong Kong First Division League, as well as in Hong Kong football. Sun Pegasus will compete in the First Division League, Senior Challenge Shield and FA Cup in this season.

Key events
 21 May 2013: Club captain Jaimes McKee rejects offers from the Chinese Super League clubs and extends a 1-year contract with the club.
 22 May 2013: Serbian defender Igor Miovic and Cameroonian midfielder Eugene Mbome extend 1-year contracts with the club.
 23 May 2013: The Hong Kong Football Association confirmed that Sun Pegasus has been assigned Mong Kok Stadium as their home ground for the following three seasons.
 30 May 2013: Hong Kong international midfielder Xu Deshuai joins fellow First Division club Kitchee for an undisclosed fee.
 3 June 2013: Hong Kong midfielder Chow Ki leaves the club (reserves) and joins fellow First Division club I-Sky Yuen Long for free.
 6 June 2013: Hong Kong midfielder Michael Campion joins the club from fellow First Division club Citizen for an undisclosed fee.
 7 June 2013: Chinese-Hong Kong striker Yuan Yang joins the club from fellow First Division club Sun Pegasus for an undisclosed fee.
 13 June 2013: Canadian-born Hong Kong midfielder Landon Ling joins the club from fellow First Division club Kitchee for an undisclosed fee.
 17 June 2013: Hong Kong midfielder Fung Kai Hong leaves the club and joins newly promoted First Division club I-Sky Yuen Long for free.
 11 July 2013: Bosnian striker Admir Raščić joins the club on a free transfer.
 11 July 2013: Serbian midfielder Aleksandar Ranđelović joins the club from Hungarian Nemzeti Bajnokság II club Békéscsaba 1912 Előre SE for an undisclosed fee.
 1 October 2013: Chinese striker Yuan Yang leaves the club and joins fellow First Division club Tuen Mun on loan until the end of the season.
 4 December 2013: South Korean striker Kim Dong-Ryeol leaves the club on mutual consent.
 7 December 2013: Hong Kong midfielder Ng Siu Fai joins the club on a free transfer.
 7 December 2013: Hong Kong midfielder Ko Chun rejoins the club from Second Division club Wing Yee for an undisclosed fee.
 30 December 2013: Australian striker Marko Jesic joins the club from A-League club Newcastle Jets on a free transfer.
 30 December 2013: Chinese-born Hong Kong midfielder Bai He leaves the club and joins Chinese League One club Shijiazhuang Yongchang for HK$100k.
 30 December 2013: Hong Kong defender Wong Yim Kwan joins the club from fellow First Division club Happy Valley for an undisclosed fee.
 1 January 2014: Hong Kong midfielder Yip Tsz Chun joins the club from fellow First Division club Tuen Mun for an undisclosed fee.
 6 January 2014: Chinese striker Yuan Yang is recalled by the club from fellow First Division club Tuen Mun.
 8 March 2014: Hong Kong midfielder Choi Kwok Wai joins the club from fellow First Division club Happy Valley on a free transfer.
 8 March 2014: Chinese striker Li Jian joins the club from fellow First Division club Happy Valley on a free transfer.

Players

Squad information

Last update: 8 March 2014
Source: Sun Pegasus FC
Ordered by squad number.
LPLocal player; FPForeign player; APAsian player; NRNon-registered player

Transfers

In

Out

Loan In

Loan out

Squad statistics
Note: Voided matches are not counted in the statistics except discipline records.

Overall Stats
{|class="wikitable" style="text-align: center;"
|-
!width="100"|
!width="60"|First Division
!width="60"|Senior Shield
!width="60"|FA Cup
!width="60"|Total Stats
|-
|align=left|Games played    ||  15 ||  4  || 1  || 20
|-
|align=left|Games won       ||  8  ||  3  || 0  || 11
|-
|align=left|Games drawn     ||  2  ||  0  || 0  || 2
|-
|align=left|Games lost      ||  5  ||  1  || 1  || 7
|-
|align=left|Goals for       ||  36 ||  9  || 2  || 47
|-
|align=left|Goals against   ||  26 ||  5  || 3  || 34
|- =
|align=left|Players used    ||  28 ||  16 || 14 || 281
|-
|align=left|Yellow cards    ||  39 ||  11 || 4  || 54
|-
|align=left|Red cards       ||  1  ||  0  || 0  || 1
|-

Players Used: Sun Pegasus have used a total of 28 different players in all competitions.

Squad Stats

Top scorers

Last update: 30 March 2014

Disciplinary record
Includes all competitive matches. Players listed below made at least one appearance for Sun Pegasus first squad during the season.

Substitution record
Includes all competitive matches.

Last updated: 30 March 2014

Captains

Competitions

Overall

First Division League

Classification

Results summary

Results by round

Matches

Pre-season friendlies

First Division League

Senior Shield

FA Cup

Notes

References

TSW Pegasus FC seasons
Sun